Tioga is a census-designated place (CDP) in northeastern Nicholas County, West Virginia, United States. As of the 2010 census, its population was 98. The town is located along a road alternatively called Tioga Road (County Route 3) in Nicholas County and Strouds Creek Road (County Route 11) in Webster County. The road can be accessed from West Virginia Route 20 in Allingdale and West Virginia Route 55 near Craigsville.

The community was named after Tioga County, Pennsylvania, the native home of several local lumbermen.

References

Census-designated places in Nicholas County, West Virginia
Census-designated places in West Virginia
Coal towns in West Virginia